Kalnapilis Arena, formerly Cido Arena, is the largest multifunctional arena in Panevėžys, Lithuania. It generally hosts track cycling events, as well as basketball games and concerts. The basketball club BC Lietkabelis, which currently competes in the domestic LKL league, uses the facility for all of its LKL home fixtures. It was opened on October 24, 2008. It replaced Sports Palace Aukštaitija as the home of BC Lietkabelis. The arena boasts an indoor 250 m long Olympic cycling track, the only one in the Baltic States.

The arena hosted the FIBA EuroBasket 2011 Group A matches and the European Track Championships.

In 2021 Velodrome hosted the second stage of inaugural 2021 UCI Track Champions League.

See also
 List of indoor arenas in Lithuania

References

External links

Indoor arenas in Lithuania
Basketball venues in Lithuania
Velodromes in Lithuania
Cycle racing in Lithuania
Buildings and structures in Panevėžys
Sport in Panevėžys
Culture in Panevėžys